Eastern Bulgaria may refer to:

 Eastern Bulgaria
 Volga Bulgaria
 Old Great Bulgaria